Dongzhuosu is a town under the administration of Jinzhou City in south-central Hebei province, China, located roughly equidistant from Jinzhou and Xinle. , it has 23 villages under its administration.

See also
List of township-level divisions of Hebei

References

Township-level divisions of Hebei